Sainte Anne was a 64-gun ship of the line of the French Navy, launched in 1756. She was captured by the Royal Navy on 25 May 1761, and commissioned as the third rate HMS St Anne.

St Anne was sold out of the Navy in 1784.

Notes

References

Lavery, Brian (2003) The Ship of the Line – Volume 1: The development of the battlefleet 1650–1850. Conway Maritime Press. .

Ships of the line of the French Navy
Ships of the line of the Royal Navy
1756 ships